Ben Brown (born 3 July 1962) is a New Zealand children's author, poet and the New Zealand Reading Ambassador (Te Awhi Rito).

Biography

Brown was born in Motueka, New Zealand, on 3 July 1962.

He lives in Lyttelton, New Zealand.

References

Living people
1962 births
New Zealand writers